The men's 20 kilometres walk at the 2019 World Athletics Championships was held at the Khalifa International Stadium in Doha, Qatar, on 4 October 2019.

Records
Before the competition records were as follows:

Schedule
The event schedule, in local time (UTC+3), was as follows:

Results
The race was started on 4 October at 23:29.

References

Women's 20 kilometres walk
Racewalking at the World Athletics Championships